Drew Miller (born March 14, 1978) is a former American football quarterback who played one season with the Detroit Fury of the Arena Football League (AFL). He first enrolled at Brigham Young University before transferring to the University of Montana.

Early years
Miller played high school football and baseball at Lakes High School in Lakewood, Washington. He started three seasons at quarterback while also playing the role of kicker and punter. As a senior, he threw for 3,366 yards with 42 touchdowns, while earning the Player of the Year award. He recorded career totals of 9,003 passing yards and 103 touchdowns. Miller also earned various honors, including First Team
All-State, First Team All-Conference three times, and First Team All-American during his senior year. He helped his baseball team end a 15-year playoff drought.

College career
Miller played for the BYU Cougars from 1997 to 1998. He was the first true freshman in the school's history to start at quarterback. He transferred to play for the Montana Grizzlies from 1999 to 2000. Miller was named the 1999 Big Sky Conference Newcomer of the Year. He was also named First Team All-Big Sky as well as First Team All-American in 1999 and 2000. He played 22 games during his collegiate career for the Cougars and Grizzlies, completing 530 of his 812 passes for 7,211 yards and 52 touchdowns.

Professional career
Miller signed with the BC Lions of the Canadian Football League on April 26, 2001. He was released by the Lions in June 2001. He played for the AFL's Detroit Fury during the 2002 Arena Football League season.

Coaching career
Miller began his coaching career as an assistant for the University of Montana for one season. He then became the quarterbacks coach at Lakes High School and the offensive coordinator at Bellarmine Preparatory School. He then became the wide receivers coach at Central Washington University for three seasons. Miller then became the wide receivers and kick returners coach for Idaho State University.

References

External links
Just Sports Stats

Living people
1978 births
American football quarterbacks
Canadian football quarterbacks
American players of Canadian football
BYU Cougars football players
Montana Grizzlies football players
BC Lions players
Detroit Fury players
Montana Grizzlies football coaches
Central Washington Wildcats football coaches
Idaho State Bengals football coaches
American Latter Day Saints
20th-century Mormon missionaries
Players of American football from Tacoma, Washington